Tibatrochus is a genus of mostly small deep water sea snails, marine gastropod mollusks in the family Eucyclidae.

Species
Species within the genus Tibatrochus include:
 Tibatrochus husaensis Nomura, 1940
 Tibatrochus incertus (Schepman, 1908)

References

External links
 To ITIS
 To World Register of Marine Species

 
Eucyclidae
Gastropod genera